Michael Kawchuk (April 23, 1931—January 24, 2021) is a former politician in Manitoba, Canada.  He was a member of the Manitoba legislature from 1966 to 1969, sitting as a member of the New Democratic Party.

The son of Nicholas Kawchuk and Annie Baran, Kawchuk was educated at the Brandon Agricultural College and the University of Manitoba.  He worked as a farmer, and became a director on the Pool Elevator Board and the Manitoba Farmer's Union.  He also served as Secretary-Treasurer of his local school district. In 1957, he married Nettie Frykas.

He was elected to the Manitoba legislature in the provincial election of 1966,  defeating Liberal William Paziuk by 64 votes in the rural riding of Ethelbert Plains.  He supported Edward Schreyer's bid to become party leader in 1968–69.

Kawchuk lost to Progressive Conservative J. Wally McKenzie by 171 votes in the 1969 election, in the redistributed riding of Roblin.

References 

New Democratic Party of Manitoba MLAs
1931 births
Living people
Canadian people of Ukrainian descent